"Garden of Love" is the third single of Dutch singer Kim-Lian. Released on 29 April 2004, the song was taken from her debut album Balance. The music video for the song was directed by Peter van Eyndt, just like the one for "Hey Boy!". The ballad managed to chart within the top 20 of the Dutch Top 40 at number 19 for two weeks.

An entirely different song of the same title was sung by Benny Hill as the opening number of the 11 March 1970 episode of The Benny Hill Show. The Benny Hill song humorously describes a garden filled with punning references to the singer's lost love (who ran off with Gus, the gardener, with the result that ". . . the fungus there reminds me of the fun Gus is having with you . . . ").

Formats and track listings
CD single
"Garden of Love" [Radio Edit] (Daniel Gibson, Jörgen Ringqvist) - 3:43
"Tracy" (Filip de Wilde, Kim-Lian) - 3:58
"Garden of Love" [Video] - 3:41

Chart performance

2004 singles
Kim-Lian songs
2004 songs
Songs written by Jörgen Ringqvist